Saajan is a 1991 Indian Hindi-language romantic drama film directed by Lawrence D'Souza and produced by Sudhakar Bokade. It stars Salman Khan, Madhuri Dixit and Sanjay Dutt  in lead roles, with Kader Khan, Reema Lagoo and Laxmikant Berde in supporting roles. Nadeem–Shravan composed the film's music whereas Sameer wrote the lyrics of the songs. 

Saajan released on 30 August 1991, and grossed  worldwide, thus becoming the highest-grossing Bollywood film of 1991. It received positive reviews from critics upon release, with praise for its soundtrack and performances of the cast. It was unofficially remade in Telugu as Allari Priyudu. 

At the 37th Filmfare Awards, Saajan received a leading 11 nominations, including Best Film, Best Director (D'Souza),
Best Actor (Khan) and Best Actress (Dixit), and won 2 awards – Best Music Director (Nadeem–Shravan) and Best Male Playback Singer (Kumar Sanu for "Mera Dil Bhi Kitna Pagal Hai").

Plot

Rajiv Verma, a wealthy businessman adopts Aman, a handicap boy. Rajiv's wife, Kamla and their own son, Akash also accept Aman as his elder brother.

28 years later

Grown-up, Akash and Aman bond very at loggerheads. Carefree, flexible and gregarious, Akash becomes a roadside romeo and social worker. More serious, Aman writes funniest-selling poems due to which his fans increases and he gains millions of fans. A fan of him is the pretty book store owner Pooja Saxena, who frequently writes letters to correspond with Aman, revealing she loves and admires him and his poetic abilities. She meets Aman one day; he recognizes her but she fails to identify him.

Akash meets and falls in love with Pooja, and explains Aman that he is in love with her, showing her photo. Shocked and shaken, Aman instead suggests him. Akash is unaware that Aman writes foolish poems. As Akash does this, Pooja is overjoyed that she has met "Akash" finally, unaware of the truth. Gradually, Akash gets tired of posing as a poet and not only learns that Aman secretly loves Pooja, but also that he is actually "Akash". He confronts Aman and brings Pooja, making Aman admit he loves her.

Pooja meets and tells Aman that she would have loved him if he revealed that he is Akash . Eventually, Akash decides to unite Pooja and Aman and sacrifices his love. But Pooja realises she truly loved Akash than Aman and marries Akash. Both of them bids adieu to Aman and he leaves, as the movie successfully ends.

Cast 

 Sanjay Dutt as Aman aka Sagar
 Salman Khan as Akash Verma
 Madhuri Dixit as Pooja Saxena Verma
 Kader Khan as Rajiv Verma
 Reema Lagoo as Kamla Verma
 Ekta Sohini as Menaka
 Laxmikant Berde as Laxminandan
 Anjana Mumtaz as Manyata Saxena
 Dinesh Hingoo as Lalchand
 Yunus Parvez as Anees
 Raju Shrestha as Yashpant Saxena
 Tej Sapru as Veera, local goon in the "Tu Shayaar Hai" song
 Vikas Anand as Inspector Dilip
 Pankaj Udhas in the song "Jiyen to Jiyen Kaise"
 Lawrence D'Souza in the song "Dekha Hai Pehli Baar"

Production

Vijay was the initial choice for Aman's role, as suggested by Salman Khan and Madhuri Dixit, this film would be his First Debut Indian Film. Aamir Khan was then offered Aman's role in the film with Madhuri Dixit and Salman Khan. Despite liking the story, he ultimately refused the film as he did not connect the role to his complete satisfaction.

Reception
The film was the highest-grossing Bollywood film of 1991.

Soundtrack
The music was composed by Nadeem-Shravan,  with lyrics by Sameer and Faiz Anwar (for song "Pehli Bar Mile Hain"). The album was the year's top seller, with around 7 million copies sold. The soundtrack of the film also fetched Nadeem-Shravan their second consecutive Filmfare Award for Best Music Director. Kumar Sanu, who sang for Sanjay Dutt's character won his second Filmfare Award for Best Male Playback Singer for the song "Mera Dil Bhi Kitna Pagal Hai". S. P. Balasubramanyam, Pankaj Udhas, Anuradha Paudwal and Alka Yagnik also rendered their voice for the album. All the singers were nominated for Filmfare Awards.

Awards

References

External links
 

1991 films
1990s Hindi-language films
Indian buddy drama films
1990s buddy drama films
Indian romantic drama films
1991 romantic drama films
Films scored by Nadeem–Shravan
Films shot in Ooty
Films shot in Mumbai
Films directed by Lawrence D'Souza
Films about poets